Grupo Desportivo Interclube is an Angolan basketball club based in Luanda. It is part of the mutisports club with the same name. The club's basketball teams (men and women) compete at the local level, at the Luanda Provincial Basketball Championships and at the Men's and Women's leagues as well as at continental level, at the annual African Basketball Club Champions League.

Interclube Men's Basketball

Honours

Men's roster

Depth chart

Staff

Manager history

Interclube Women's Basketball
Interclube holds the record of titles won in the African Basketball Club Champions League (5).

Honours

Women's roster

Depth chart

Staff

Manager history and performance

Players

See also
Interclube Football
Interclube Handball
BIC Basket
Federação Angolana de Basquetebol

External links
Official website
Facebook profile
Men's Africabasket profile
Women's Afribasket profile

References

Basketball teams established in 1976
Basketball teams in Angola
Sports clubs in Angola
1976 establishments in Angola